Yeti Lane is the debut studio album by French band Yeti Lane, released on 17 September 2009 in Europe on Clapping Music, and on 25 January 2010 on Sonic Cathedral in the UK.

Track listing
All tracks written and composed by Yeti Lane.

 "First-Rate Pretender" – 3:35
 "Twice" – 4:48
 "Black Soul" – 4:05
 "Think It's Done" – 4:12
 "Tiny Correction" – 3:21
 "Only One Look" – 4:27
 "Lucky Bag" – 4:00
 "Lonesome George" – 3:43
 "Solar" – 4:06
 "Heart's Architecture" – 4:49

Personnel
 Ben Pleng – lead and backing vocals, electric and acoustic guitars, monophonic analog synth, cheap keyboards and laptop
 LoAc – lead and backing vocals, electric and acoustic guitars, electric bass, monophonic and polyphonic analog synths, digital keyboards, laptop, organ and mellotron
 Charlie B – drums and percussions, laptop, drum boxes and samplers, monophonic analog synths and organ
 Etienne "Zombie Zombie" Jaumet – alto sax on "Tiny Correction"
 Lori Sean Berg "Sans Nipple" – trumpet on "Tiny Correction"
 Cyann – piano, polyphonic analog synth, mellotron, backing vocals on "Solar" and "Heart's Architecture"

References

2010 albums